Khalil Delshon Mack (born February 22, 1991) is an American football outside linebacker for the Los Angeles Chargers of the National Football League (NFL). He played college football at Buffalo and was drafted by the Oakland Raiders with the fifth overall pick in the 2014 NFL Draft.

Mack holds the all-time NCAA record for forced fumbles and is also tied for career tackles for loss in the NCAA. In 2015, he became the first player in NFL history to be selected first-team All-Pro at two different positions, defensive end and outside linebacker, in the same season. In 2018, Mack was traded to the Chicago Bears for two first-round draft picks and signed a six-year, 141 million extension, becoming the highest-paid defensive player in NFL history at the time. He was traded to the Los Angeles Chargers in 2022.

Early life
Mack was raised by his parents: high school sweethearts Yolanda, a teacher, and Sandy Mack Sr., a program specialist, in Fort Pierce, Florida. He has two brothers: Sandy Jr. and LeDarius. His father introduced him to sports at the age of five. Mack took an early liking to baseball and basketball although he played Pop Warner football.

Mack attended Fort Pierce Westwood High School in Fort Pierce. He had played quarterback and was nicknamed "Bombshell Man." However, throwing the ball short was a major struggle for Mack, so he became a linebacker. For the rest of his athletic career, Mack had been relying on basketball to get him a college scholarship, but his plans were dashed by a tear in his patella tendon before his sophomore season. After this injury, his high school football coach, Waides Ashmon, recruited him to the sport, promising Mack and his parents that it would earn him a scholarship.

In his only year of high school football, Mack had 140 tackles, including eight for a loss, and nine sacks. He was named third-team All-State in Florida, as well as first-team All-Area, and helped lead the Panthers to a district championship. Being a newcomer to the sport, Mack was rated as only a two-star recruit by Rivals.com. He received a scholarship from the State University of New York at Buffalo to play Division I football.

College career

After redshirting as a freshman in 2009, Mack broke into the starting lineup and was one of the most productive defenders in the MAC. He totaled 68 tackles, including  for loss,  sacks, 10 pass breakups, eight quarterback hurries, and two forced fumbles. Mack earned third-team all-conference honors. He chose to wear the uniform number 46 as a motivational reminder that his true potential was not being recognized – 46 was the overall rating assigned to him (out of a maximum of 99) in EA Sports' college football video game, NCAA Football 11.

Mack continued where he left off in 2010, with a dominant sophomore season. Mack led the team in sacks, tackles for loss, and forced fumbles, on the way to being named first-team All-MAC. He recorded 64 total tackles, including  for loss (third best in the nation),  sacks, one interception, two pass breakups, thirteen quarterback hurries, and five forced fumbles. Despite being suspended for the first game of the season following an altercation with teammate wide receiver Fred Lee, Mack set career highs in tackles (94), tackles for loss (21 – fourth in the nation), and sacks (8). He also recorded two pass breakups, four quarterback hurries, and four forced fumbles. He earned first-team all-conference honors for the second consecutive season.

Starting all 13 games, Mack recorded 100 tackles including 19 tackles for loss, 10.5 sacks, three interceptions, one which he returned for a touchdown, and forced five fumbles. He won the CFPA Linebacker Trophy for the 2013 season, and he was named the 2013 MAC Defensive Player of the Year, becoming the first Bull to win the award in Buffalo's history within the MAC (1999–present). He was also named a second-team All-American by the Associated Press. Mack finished tied for first for the NCAA in career tackles for loss with 75 and set a new record for forced fumbles with 16. Buffalo's independent student newspaper, The Spectrum, also ranked Mack as the best Buffalo football player in the Division I history of the program.

College statistics

Records
Oakland career records
 Single-game sacks record (5)

Buffalo career records
 Most tackles for loss (75)
 Most sacks (28.5)
 Most forced fumbles (16)

NCAA records
 Tied for first in tackles for loss (75)
 Most forced fumbles (16)

Professional career
Leading up to the 2014 NFL Draft, Mack was projected as a high first-round pick in many mock drafts. He was selected with the fifth overall pick by the Oakland Raiders, making him the highest selected Buffalo player ever, and the first (and only) selected in the first round. Previously, the highest selected player from Buffalo was defensive tackle Gerry Philbin, who was selected with the 33rd overall pick by the New York Jets in 1964. Mack chose to switch from his college uniform number, 46, to 52 in order to comply with the NFL's numbering rules.

Oakland Raiders

2014 season: Rookie year
After signing a four-year contract worth $18.67 million guaranteed, Mack made his NFL debut in the season-opener against the New York Jets,   recording six tackles during the 19–14 loss. During Week 7 against the Arizona Cardinals, he recorded a season-high 11 tackles during the 24–13 loss. During a Week 11 13–6 road loss to the San Diego Chargers, Mack recorded five tackles and his first career sack on Philip Rivers. Three weeks later against the San Francisco 49ers, Mack recorded two tackles and sacked Colin Kaepernick twice during the 24–13 victory. This was Mack's first game with multiple sacks in his career.

Mack finished his rookie year with 76 combined tackles (59 solo), four sacks, a forced fumble, and three pass deflections in 16 games and starts. By the end of his rookie season, Mack was considered a candidate for AP Defensive Rookie of the Year. He eventually finished in third place in Defensive Rookie of the Year voting behind defensive tackle Aaron Donald of the St. Louis Rams and linebacker C. J. Mosley of the Baltimore Ravens. However, Mack was named the Defensive Rookie of the Year by analysts on ESPN's NFL Live and was one of three linebackers selected to USA Football's sixth annual All-Fundamentals Team (the others being All-Pro veterans Luke Kuechly of the Carolina Panthers and Tamba Hali of the Kansas City Chiefs). He was ranked 49th by his fellow players on the NFL Top 100 Players of 2015.

2015 season

In March 2015, the NFL amended the league's uniform numbering rules to allow linebackers to wear the numbers 40–49. As a result, Mack considered reverting from the number 52 to 46, the number he wore during his college career, but ultimately decided not to do so. In August 2015, Mack was named as the NFL's number one "making the leap" player. Before the start of the season, he shifted from linebacker to right defensive end and played at both positions.

During a Week 3 27-20 road victory over the Cleveland Browns, Mack recorded four tackles and his first two sacks of the season on Josh McCown. In the next game against the Chicago Bears, Mack recorded four tackles and a sack in the narrow 22-20 road loss. During a Week 13 18-13 road loss to the Detroit Lions, he recorded eight tackles and sacked Matthew Stafford twice. In the next game against the Tennessee Titans, Mack recorded six tackles and another two sacks on rookie Marcus Mariota during the 24–21 road victory.

During a Week 15 road matchup against the Denver Broncos, Mack sacked Brock Osweiler five times, tying a franchise record for sacks in a game previously set by defensive end Howie Long in 1983. This was Mack's third game in a row in which he recorded multiple sacks in a single game. The game, which the Raiders won 15–12, was the franchise's first over the Broncos since September 2011. The following week, Mack was announced to be going to the Pro Bowl, his first, along with teammates safety Charles Woodson and fullback Marcel Reece.

Mack finished his second professional season with 77 combined tackles (57 solo), 15 sacks, two forced fumbles, and two pass deflections in 16 games and starts. After the conclusion of the season, he became the first player in NFL history to make the AP All-Pro First Team at two positions in the same year: right defensive end and outside linebacker. Mack was ranked 13th by his fellow players on the NFL Top 100 Players of 2016.

2016 season
During a narrow Week 4 28-27 road victory over the Baltimore Ravens, Mack recorded six tackles and his first sack of the season on Joe Flacco. During a Week 8 30-24 overtime road victory over the Tampa Bay Buccaneers, Mack recorded a team-high seven tackles and sacked Jameis Winston twice. In the next game against the Denver Broncos, Mack recorded three tackles and sacked Trevor Siemian twice with one of them being a strip sack which he recovered as the Raiders won by a score of 30–20. He earned AFC Defensive Player of the Week for his effort against Denver.

During a narrow Week 12 35–32 victory over the Carolina Panthers, Mack recorded his first career interception off of quarterback Cam Newton and returned it six yards for his first NFL touchdown. Mack also forced a fumble from Newton in the final minute of the game to seal the win for the Raiders. Mack finished the game with an interception, a sack, a forced fumble, a fumble recovery, and a defensive touchdown, making him the first player since former Raiders' cornerback Charles Woodson, who was with the Green Bay Packers at the time, in 2009 to do so. Mack's performance earned him AFC Defensive Player of the Week for Week 12. He was also named AFC Defensive Player of the Month for November, registering four sacks, two forced fumbles, and an interception. In the next game against the Buffalo Bills, Mack recorded seven tackles and a strip sack on Tyrod Taylor and recovered the football late in the fourth quarter to seal a 38–24 win.

Mack finished the 2016 season with 73 combined tackles (54 solo), 11 sacks, five forced fumbles, three fumble recoveries, three passes defended, and an interception returned for a touchdown in 16 games and starts. He helped lead the Raiders to their first playoff appearance since 2002 and was named to his second consecutive Pro Bowl and First-team All-Pro. In the Wild Card Round of the playoffs against the Houston Texans, Mack recorded a team-high 11 tackles during the 27–14 road loss. Mack was named the NFL Defensive Player of the Year for the 2016 season.  He was ranked 5th by his peers on the NFL Top 100 Players of 2017 as the highest-ranked defensive lineman. He was also named the professional winner of the Butkus Award.

2017 season

On April 20, 2017, the Raiders picked up the fifth-year option on Mack's contract. Heading into his fourth season, Mack had his eyes set on the single-season sack record.

During a Week 2 45-20 victory over the New York Jets, Mack recorded four tackles and his first sack of the season on Josh McCown. In the next game against the Washington Redskins, Mack recorded a team-high nine tackles and sacked Kirk Cousins once during the 27–10 road loss. The following week against the Denver Broncos, Mack recorded seven tackles and sacked quarterback Trevor Siemian twice in the 16–10 road loss.

After a Week 10 bye, Mack registered at least one sack in five consecutive games from Week 11 to 15. During a Week 13 24-17 victory over the New York Giants, Mack recorded four tackles and a strip-sack on Geno Smith and recovered the ball. This was his first forced fumble and fumble recovery of the season. Two weeks later against the Dallas Cowboys, Mack had six tackles and sacked Dak Prescott twice in the narrow 20–17 loss.

On December 19, 2017, Mack was named to his third straight Pro Bowl. He finished the 2017 season with 78 combined tackles (61 solo), 10.5 sacks, a forced fumble, a fumble recovery, and three pass deflections in 16 games and starts. He was ranked 16th by his fellow players on the NFL Top 100 Players of 2018.

Chicago Bears

2018 season

On September 1, 2018, following Mack's holdout through the entire preseason, the Raiders traded him, a 2020 second-round pick (Cole Kmet), and a conditional fifth-round draft pick in 2020 (condition failed, turned into a 2020 seventh-round pick, Arlington Hambright) to the Chicago Bears for 2019 (24th overall, Josh Jacobs) and a 2020 first-round pick (19th overall, Damon Arnette), as well as a 2019 sixth-round pick and a 2020 third-round pick (Bryan Edwards). Shortly after the trade, Mack signed a six-year extension with the Bears worth $141 million featuring $90 million guaranteed, becoming the highest-paid defender in NFL history.

On September 9, 2018, Mack made his Bears debut on Sunday Night Football against the Green Bay Packers. In the second quarter of the game, he recorded a strip-sack on backup quarterback DeShone Kizer, who was playing in relief of Aaron Rodgers due to a knee injury. Later in the same quarter, he intercepted a pass from Kizer and returned it for a 27-yard touchdown. The Bears narrowly lost on the road 24–23. He became the first player since 1982 to record a sack, forced fumble, a fumble recovery, interception, and touchdown in one half. It was also his second time recording a sack, forced fumble, fumble recovery, interception and touchdown in a single game that dated back to Week 12 of the 2016 season. In his second game with the Bears, Mack recorded four tackles and a strip-sack of Russell Wilson during a 24–17 Monday Night Football victory over the Seattle Seahawks. Mack continued his excellent play the following week, recording five tackles and a strip-sack on Josh Rosen in a narrow 16–14 road victory over the Arizona Cardinals, the first player to record strip-sacks in three straight games since Mack himself did it in 2016. During a Week 4 48–10 victory over the Tampa Bay Buccaneers, Mack recorded four tackles and another strip-sack. He became the first player to record sacks and forced fumbles in four straight games since Colts outside linebacker Robert Mathis did so in 2005. Mack is also the first player to record forced fumbles in the first four games of a season since Jaguars defensive end Tony Brackens did so in 1999. On October 4, Mack was named NFC Defensive Player of the Month for September after recording 17 tackles, five sacks, four forced fumbles, two pass deflections, a fumble recovery, and an interception returned for a touchdown. Mack is the first Bears player to win this award since cornerback Charles Tillman in October 2012.

During a Week 6 31–28 overtime road loss to the Miami Dolphins, Mack recorded two tackles before suffering an ankle injury that resulted in him missing the first game of his career two weeks later against the New York Jets. Despite his absence, the Bears limited the Jets to 207 total yards, including just 57 rushing, as Chicago won 24–10. Mack also missed the following week's 41–9 victory over the Buffalo Bills before returning in the Week 10 Thanksgiving matchup against the Detroit Lions; in the latter's 34–22 Bears win, he recorded five tackles and sacked Matthew Stafford twice.

During a Week 11 25-20 victory over the Minnesota Vikings, Mack recorded two tackles, sacked quarterback Kirk Cousins once, and forced a fumble from running back Dalvin Cook. Three weeks later, against the 11–1 Los Angeles Rams, he recorded three tackles and forced Jared Goff to fumble in a defensive effort that saw the Bears record four turnovers and win 15–6. In the next game against the Packers, Mack sacked Aaron Rodgers 2.5 times and had two tackles for losses. On his half-sack, Mack was turned around backward by offensive lineman Jason Spriggs; unable to see Rodgers, Mack helped Bilal Nichols bring Rodgers down for a sack by using his back. The Bears won the game 24–17 and finished atop the NFC North while eliminating the Packers from postseason contention.

Mack finished the 2018 season with 47 combined tackles (37 solo), 12.5 sacks, six forced fumbles, two fumble recoveries, four pass deflections, and an interception returned for a touchdown in 14 games and 13 starts; the 12.5 sacks were the most by a Bears player since Richard Dent in 1993. In the Wild Card Round against the Philadelphia Eagles, he recorded six tackles in the narrow 16–15 loss. Mack was later selected to his fourth Pro Bowl and his third first-team All-Pro, though he did not participate in the former due to injury. Mack received an overall grade of 90.7 from Pro Football Focus in 2018, which ranked as the 2nd highest grade among all qualifying edge defenders. He finished second in AP Defensive Player of the Year voting. In June 2019, he received his second career pro Butkus Award. He was ranked third by his fellow players on the NFL Top 100 Players of 2019.

2019 season

During a narrow Week 2 16-14 road victory over the Denver Broncos, Mack recorded a tackle and his first sack of the season on Joe Flacco. In the next game against the Washington Redskins, he recorded four tackles, two forced fumbles, and sacked Case Keenum twice in a 31–15 road victory. The following week against the Minnesota Vikings, Mack recorded two tackles, 1.5 times, and a forced fumble the ball once in the 16–6 victory.

During a Week 5 24-21 loss in London to his former team, the Oakland Raiders, Mack recorded three tackles and a fumble recovery. Three weeks later against the Los Angeles Chargers, he recorded four tackles, two pass deflections, and his first sack in a month on Philip Rivers in the narrow 17–16 loss. During a Week 12 19-14 victory over the New York Giants, Mack recorded three tackles and a strip sack on Daniel Jones which was recovered by teammate Nick Williams. Two weeks later against the Dallas Cowboys on Thursday Night Football, Mack recorded two tackles and a diving sack on Dak Prescott in the 31–24 victory. During a Week 16 26-3 loss to the Kansas City Chiefs, Mack recorded four tackles and a sack on Patrick Mahomes.

On December 17, 2019, Mack was named a starter for the 2020 Pro Bowl. He finished the season with 47 combined tackles (40 solo), 8.5 sacks, five forced fumbles, a fumble recovery, and four pass deflections in 16 games and starts. Mack was ranked 19th by his fellow players on the NFL Top 100 Players of 2020. He was named to the Pro Football Hall of Fame All-Decades Team for the 2010s.

2020 season
During a Week 2 17–13 victory over the New York Giants, Mack recorded three tackles and his first sack of the season on Daniel Jones. He also recovered a strip-sack forced by teammate Robert Quinn on Jones. Three weeks later against the Tampa Bay Buccaneers, Mack recorded three tackles and sacked Tom Brady twice during the narrow 20–19 victory.

During a Week 10 19-13 loss to the Minnesota Vikings, Mack recorded three tackles and his first interception of the season off a pass thrown by Kirk Cousins and made a 33-yard return. During a Week 14 36-7 victory over the Houston Texans, Mack recorded two tackles and sacked Deshaun Watson in the endzone for a safety and forced a fumble on Duke Johnson that he also recovered. In the regular-season finale against the Green Bay Packers, Mack recorded four tackles and a sack on Aaron Rodgers, but the Bears lost 35–16. In the Wild Card Round against the New Orleans Saints, he recorded two tackles and a pass deflection in the 21–9 road loss.

On December 21, Mack was named to the Pro Bowl for the sixth consecutive season. At the time of the announcement, he had eight sacks, three forced fumbles, two fumble recoveries, and an interception. Mack was ranked 23rd by his fellow players on the NFL Top 100 Players of 2021.

2021 season
During a Week 2 20–17 victory over the Cincinnati Bengals, Mack recorded two tackles and his first sack of the season on Joe Burrow. In the next game against the Cleveland Browns, Mack recorded two sacks and two tackles in a 26-6 road loss. Two weeks later, Mack recorded seven tackles and a sack in a 20–9 road victory over his former team, the Las Vegas Raiders.

Mack played in seven games during the 2021 season before undergoing season-ending foot surgery. He was placed on injured reserve on November 19. He finished the season with 19 tackles and six sacks in seven games and starts.

Los Angeles Chargers

2022 season
On March 16, 2022, the Bears traded Mack to the Los Angeles Chargers in exchange for a second-round pick in the 2022 NFL Draft (Jaquan Brisker) and a sixth-round pick in the 2023 NFL Draft. This move reunited him with Chargers head coach Brandon Staley, who served as the outside linebackers coach in Mack's first year with the Chicago Bears.

In his Chargers debut against his former team, the Las Vegas Raiders, Mack recorded three sacks and one forced fumble. The game marked his first three-plus-sack outing since Week 14 of the 2015 season, and he became only the fifth non-rookie to have three-plus sacks in a debut with a new team since individual sacks were first recorded in 1982. During Week 9, Mack recorded two tackles, forced a fumble, and recovered a fumble during a 20–17 win over the Atlanta Falcons.

NFL career statistics

Regular season

Postseason

Awards and honors

NFL
 NFL Defensive Player of the Year (2016)
 4× First-team All-Pro (2015, 2016, 2018)
 Second-team All-Pro (2020)
 7× Pro Bowl (2015–2020, 2022)
 NFL 2010s All-Decade Team
 PFWA All-Rookie Team (2014)
 2× Butkus Award (pro) (2016, 2018)
 100 Greatest Bears of All-Time

College
 MAC Defensive Player of the Year (2013)
 Jack Lambert Trophy (2013)
 First-team All-American (2013)
 3× First-team All-MAC (2011–2013)

Personal life
Mack taught himself to play guitar as a freshman at the University at Buffalo. His reputation as a singer led his Raiders teammates to attempt to goad him into singing R. Kelly and Usher songs. He is a fan of musicians Tim McGraw and Hanson.

Mack is an active Christian and spent much of his youth attending a church where his father and mother both served as deacons.

In 2017, Mack's younger brother LeDarius joined his alma mater, the University at Buffalo, after two years at ASA College in Miami. LeDarius joined his brother on the Bears as an undrafted free agent in 2020, and was later signed to the practice squad.

References

External links

 
 Los Angeles Chargers bio
 Buffalo Bulls bio

1991 births
Living people
People from Fort Pierce, Florida
African-American Christians
African-American players of American football
Players of American football from Florida
American football defensive ends
American football outside linebackers
Buffalo Bulls football players
Oakland Raiders players
Chicago Bears players
Los Angeles Chargers players
Unconferenced Pro Bowl players
American Conference Pro Bowl players
National Conference Pro Bowl players
21st-century African-American sportspeople